White Ninja may refer to:

People
Kazuo Sakurada (1948–2020), Japanese professional wrestler who used the ring name "White Ninja"
Keiji Mutoh (born 1962), Japanese professional wrestler who used the ring name "White Ninja"

Arts and entertainment
White Ninja (webcomic), by Scott Bevan and Kent Earl
White Ninja, a 1990 novel by Eric Van Lustbader